The North Carolina General Assembly of 1779 met in three sessions in three locations in the years 1779 and 1780. The first session was held in Smithfield from May 3 to May 15, 1779; the second session in Halifax, from October 18 to November 10, 1779; the third and final session in New Bern, from January to February, 1780.

Each of the 50 North Carolina counties was authorized by the North Carolina Constitution of 1776 to elect one Senator and two members of the House of Commons.  In addition, six districts (also called boroughs) were authorized to elect one House member each.  Richard Caswell was elected governor by the legislature.

Legislation
For additional laws and minutes of the 1779 General Assembly, see Legislative Documents.

Councilors of State
This General Assembly selected the following Councilors of State on May 3, 1779:
 Joseph Leech from Craven County
 Robert Bignall from Edgecombe County
 John Sampson 
 John Simpson from Pitt County
 Thomas Respass, Senior from Beaufort County
 Isaac Guion from Craven County
 William Whitfield from Dobbs County
 Waightstill Avery from Burke Count (selected on October 25, 1779)
 Edward Starkey from Onslow County (selected on October 30, 1779)

House of Commons

Leadership of the House of Commons

 Speaker: Thomas Benbury (Chowan County)
 Clerk: John Hunt (Franklin County)

Members of the House of Commons

In 1779, the General Assembly abolished Bute County and Tryon County. They also created eleven new counties: Franklin, Gates, Jones, Lincoln, Montgomery, Randolph, Richmond, Rutherford, Sullivan, Warren, and Wayne Counties.  Members of the House of Commons are listed below, along with the county they represented:

Senate

Senate leadership
 Speaker: Allen Jones (Northampton County), resigned October 25, 1779; Abner Nash, elected to replace Jones October 26, 1779
 Clerk: John Sitgreaves (Craven County)

Members of the senate

Members of the senate and counties they represented included the following

Notes

References

1779
General Assembly
General Assembly
 1779
 1779